Green Point Observatory is a private observatory in Oyster Bay, Sydney, Australia, and is the home of the Sutherland Astronomical Society. It is located at the corner of Green Point and Caravan Head Roads. It consists of a dome, library,  Newtonian telescope, a meeting hall seating 100 people, and a roll-off roof observatory with a   Schmidt Cassegrain Telescope. The observatory is used by members of the society for observing stars and eclipses, research, astro imaging as well as hosting public education courses and monthly open nights.

The observatory was first constructed on the site, completed in 1969 following the founding of the Sutherland Astronomical Society, then known as the James Cook Astronomers Club. At that time, the observatory consisted of a dome housing a  Newtonian telescope and small library.

In 1974, a foyer and meeting hall accommodating 50 people was added.

In 1997, a roll-off roof observatory and storeroom was added adjacent to the existing observatory. Soon afterwards, a C14  Schmidt Cassegrain telescope was added, along with CCD imaging equipment.

The observatory was closed for much of 2007 as further additions were made. The two buildings were joined into one, the meeting hall was extended to seat 100 people, and a unisex toilet and library annexe were added.

The observatory hosts annual public star parties, an annual astronomy course, group bookings for school/scout/community groups as well as excellent facilities for the members of the Sutherland Astronomical Society to meet, image and conduct research.

References

External links

Sutherland Astronomical Society

Astronomical observatories in New South Wales
1969 establishments in Australia